Rho Aurigae (ρ Aur, ρ Aurigae) is the Bayer designation for a binary star system in the northern constellation of Auriga. It is faintly visible to the naked eye with an apparent visual magnitude of +5.22. Judging by parallax measurements, this system is approximately  distant from the Earth, give or take a 30-light-year margin of error.

System
ρ Aurigae is a single-lined spectroscopic binary system; the presence of a companion object is revealed by shifts in the stellar spectrum. The pair orbit each other with a period of 34.49 days and an orbital eccentricity of 0.10.

The primary component of this system is a B-type main-sequence star defined as a standard star for the stellar classification of B5 V. The deduced mass of the secondary and the lack of evidence for it in the spectrum suggest it may be a B- or A-type star somewhat less luminous than the primary.

Name
Rho Aurigae, along with λ Aur and μ Aur, were Kazwini's Al Ḣibāʽ (ألحباع), the Tent. According to the catalogue of stars in the Technical Memorandum 33-507 – A Reduced Star Catalog Containing 537 Named Stars, Al Ḣibāʽ were the title for three stars: λ Aur as Al Ḣibāʽ I, μ Aur as Al Ḣibāʽ II and σ Aur as Al Ḣibāʽ III.

References

Further reading

External links
 HR 1749 in Bright Star Catalogue
 ρ Aurigae image

034759
Spectroscopic binaries
025048
Aurigae, Rho
Auriga (constellation)
B-type main-sequence stars
Aurigae, 20
1749
Durchmusterung objects